Rumford is the northern section of the city of East Providence, Rhode Island, USA. The Rumford section of East Providence borders Seekonk, Massachusetts, Pawtucket, Rhode Island and the Ten Mile River (Seekonk River). Rumford has been part of three towns and two states: Rehoboth, Massachusetts, Seekonk and East Providence, Rhode Island. It became part of Rhode Island in 1862. Rumford Baking Powder was made in the town at the Rumford Chemical Works and was named after Sir Benjamin Thompson, Count Rumford.

Wannamoisett Country Club was established in Rumford in 1898 on land rented from Rumford Chemical Works and it hosts the Northeast Amateur Invitational Golf Tournament each year. The 1931 PGA Championship was played here.

About  of the Rumford area was listed on the National Register of Historic Places in 1980, encompassing the historic heart of old Seekonk and the 19th-century center of East Providence.

See also
National Register of Historic Places listings in Providence County, Rhode Island

References

East Providence, Rhode Island
Historic districts in Providence County, Rhode Island
Historic districts on the National Register of Historic Places in Rhode Island
National Register of Historic Places in Providence County, Rhode Island
Queen Anne architecture in Rhode Island
Shingle Style architecture in Rhode Island
Villages in Providence County, Rhode Island
Villages in Rhode Island